This is a list of Israel's ambassadors to Japan. The ambassadors are based in Tokyo.

List of Ambassadors 
 Ministers to Japan
 Joseph Linton (1952–1957)

 Ambassadors to Japan
 Daniel Lewin (1960–1963)
 Mordechai Shneerson (1963–1966)
 Moshe Bartur (1966–1972)
 Shaul Ramati (1974–1977)
 Zvi Kedar (1978–1980)
 Amnon Ben-Yochanan (1980–1985)
 Yaacov Cohen (1985-1988)
 Nahum Eshkol
 Moshe Ben-Yaacov (1996–2000)
 Yitzhak Leor (2000–2003)
 Eli Cohen-Artzi (2004–2007)
 Nissim Ben-Shetrit (2007–2013)
 Ruth Kahanoff (2013–2017)
 Yaffa Ben-Ari (2017–2021)
 Gilad Cohen (2021– )

References 

Japan
Israel